Badaro is a residential neighbourhood and business hub in Beirut, Lebanon. 

Badaro and Badaró may also refer to

Badaró or Manlio Hedair Badaró (1933–2008), Portuguese actor and comedian
Clea Badaro (1913–1968), Egyptian painter and designer
Líbero Badaró (1798–1830), Italian Brazilian physician, botanist, journalist and politician

See also
Francisco Badaró, municipality in the state of Minas Gerais